Ischnura denticollis, the black-fronted forktail, is a species of narrow-winged damselfly in the family Coenagrionidae. It is found in Central America and North America.

The IUCN conservation status of Ischnura denticollis is "LC", least concern, with no immediate threat to the species' survival. The population is stable.

References

Further reading

 

Ischnura
Articles created by Qbugbot
Insects described in 1839